The Comarca del Ebro is a comarca of the Province of Burgos in the autonomous community of Castile and León, Spain. It is located in the northeast of the province, and is divided from northwest to southeast by the River Ebro. The Obarenes Mountains separate the comarca from the Meseta Central to the west. Its capital is  Miranda de Ebro, and its population is roughly 58,000 in the 2000s. 

Two of its municipalities—Condado de Treviño and La Puebla de Arganzón—together form the enclave of Treviño, completely surrounded by the province of Álava, and hence are not contiguous to the rest of the comarca.

Municipalities and localities 
The comarca includes the following municipalities and other localities:

Comarcas of the Province of Burgos